Meira is a local region in the Galician Province of Lugo. The overall population of this  local region is 5,124 (2019).

Municipalities
Meira, Pol, Ribeira de Piquín and Riotorto.

References 

Comarcas of the Province of Lugo